Raniganj  is a railway  station on the Bardhaman–Asansol section. It is located in Asansol, Paschim Bardhaman district in the Indian state of West Bengal. It lies in the heart of Raniganj Coalfield and serves the neighbourhood of Raniganj in Asansol, and the surrounding mining-industrial area of Asansol.

Overview

Mining-industry zone
"The entire belt between Durgapur (158 km from Howrah), and all the way up to Dhanbad and beyond is industrialized. Apart from factories, there are many coalmines, some closed now, and some with fires burning deep in the mineshafts. The mining area extends for a large area, mostly to the south of the tracks.  Quite a portion of the track passes through cuttings, where the surrounding area is higher than the track level, resulting in the profusion of characteristic small masonry bridges crossing the tracks."

History
The first passenger train in eastern India ran from Howrah to Hooghly on 15 August 1854. The track was extended to Raniganj by 1855.

Electrification 
The Waria–Asansol sector was electrified in 1960–61.

References

External links
  Trains at Raniganj
 

Railway stations in Paschim Bardhaman district
Asansol railway division